Jabłonica Polska  (Yablunytsia Pol’s’ka) is a village in the administrative district of Gmina Haczów, within Brzozów County, Subcarpathian Voivodeship, in south-eastern Poland.

The village has a population of 1,076.

References

Villages in Brzozów County